This is a comprehensive list of victories of the  cycling team. The races are categorized according to the UCI Continental Circuits rules.

Sources:

1980 – Reynolds
 Stage 16a Vuelta a España, Dominique Arnaud
 Stage 3b Vuelta a los Valles Mineros, José Luis Laguía
 Trofeo Masferrer, Juan Martín Ocaña

1981 – Reynolds
 Vuelta a España Mountains classification, José Luis Laguía
 Overall Vuelta a Burgos, José Luis Laguía

1982 – Reynolds
 Overall Vuelta a Burgos, José Luis Laguía
 Overall Tour of the Basque Country, José Luis Laguía
 Road Race Championships, José Luis Laguía
Stages 6, 9 & 11 Vuelta a España, José Luis Laguía
Stage 8 Vuelta a España, Jesús Hernández
Stage 15 Vuelta a España, Ángel Arroyo
 Vuelta a España Mountains classification, José Luis Laguía

1983 – Reynolds
 Overall Tour of the Basque Country, Julián Gorospe
 Road Race Championships, Carlos Hernández
Stage 15 Tour de France, Ángel Arroyo
Stage 14 Vuelta a España, Carlos Hernández
Stage 16 Vuelta a España, José Luis Laguía
Stage 18 Vuelta a España, Jesús Hernández
 Vuelta a España Mountains classification, José Luis Laguía

1984 – Reynolds
Stage 19 Tour de France, Ángel Arroyo
Stages 14 & 18b Vuelta a España, Julián Gorospe
Vuelta a Andalucía, Julián Gorospe

1985 – Reynolds
Stage 15 Tour de France, Eduardo Chozas
 Vuelta a España Mountains classification, José Luis Laguía

1986 – Reynolds
Vuelta a Murcia, Miguel Induráin
Tour de l'Avenir, Miguel Induráin
Stage 19 Tour de France, Julián Gorospe
 Vuelta a España Mountains classification, José Luis Laguía

1988 – Reynolds
 Overall Tour de France, Pedro Delgado
Stage 13, Pedro Delgado
Volta a Catalunya, Miguel Induráin

1989 – Reynolds
 Overall Paris–Nice, Miguel Induráin
 Overall Critérium International, Miguel Induráin
Stage 19 Tour de France, Miguel Induráin
 Overall Vuelta a España, Pedro Delgado

1990 – Banesto
 Overall Paris–Nice, Miguel Induráin
 Overall Tour of the Basque Country, Julián Gorospe
Clásica de San Sebastián, Miguel Induráin
Stage 16 Tour de France, Miguel Induráin

1991 – Banesto
 Overall Volta a Catalunya, Miguel Induráin
  Overall Tour de France, Miguel Induráin
Team classification 
Stage 8, Miguel Induráin
Stage 21, Miguel Induráin

1992 – Banesto
 Overall Paris–Nice, Jean-François Bernard
 Overall Critérium International, Jean-François Bernard
 Overall Volta a Catalunya, Miguel Induráin
 Overall Giro d'Italia, Miguel Induráin
 Overall Tour de France, Miguel Induráin
Prologue, Stage 9 & 19, Miguel Induráin

1993 – Banesto
 Overall Giro d'Italia, Miguel Induráin
  Overall Tour de France, Miguel Induráin
Prologue & Stage 9, Miguel Induráin

1994 – Banesto
  Overall Tour de France, Miguel Induráin
Stage 9, Miguel Induráin
Vuelta a España Team classification 
 World Time Trial Championship, Miguel Induráin

1995 – Banesto
 Overall Critérium du Dauphiné Libéré, Miguel Induráin
 Overall Tour de France, Miguel Induráin
Stage 8 & 19, Miguel Induráin

1996 – Banesto
 Dauphiné Libéré, Miguel Induráin

1997 – Banesto
Stage 20 Tour de France, Abraham Olano
 Vuelta a España Mountains classification, José María Jiménez

1998 – Banesto
 Overall Dauphiné Libéré, Armand de Las Cuevas
 Overall Vuelta a España, Abraham Olano
 Mountains classification, José María Jiménez
 Team classification

1999 – Banesto
Volta a Catalunya – Manuel Beltrán
Tour de France Team classification 
 Mountains classification Vuelta a España, José María Jiménez
Team classification

2000 – Banesto
 Overall Volta a Catalunya José María Jiménez
  Young rider classification Tour de France, Francisco Mancebo
Stage 18, José Vicente García

2001 – iBanesto.com
 Points classification Vuelta a España, José María Jiménez
 Mountains classification, José María Jiménez
Team classification

2002 – iBanesto.com
 Overall Tour of the Basque Country, Aitor Osa
 Vuelta a España Mountains classification, Aitor Osa

2003 – iBanesto.com
  Young rider classification Tour de France, Denis Menchov
Stage 18, Pablo Lastras
Vuelta a España Team classification

2004 – Illes Balears–Banesto

Stage 1 Vuelta a la Comunitat Valenciana, Antonio Colom
Stage 2 Vuelta a Murcia, José Iván Gutiérrez
Stage 6 Paris–Nice, Denis Menchov
Stage 3 Setmana Catalana de Ciclisme, Isaac Gálvez
 Overall Tour of the Basque Country, Denis Menchov
Stage 4, Denis Menchov
Stage 1 Vuelta a Aragón, Denis Menchov
 Overall Vuelta a La Rioja, Vladimir Karpets
Vuelta a Castilla y León Stage 1, José Iván Gutiérrez
Vuelta a Castilla y León Stage 2, Team Time Trial
Stage 6 Deutschland Tour – Francisco Mancebo
Stage 1 Volta a Catalunya, Team Time Trial
Stage 7 Volta a Catalunya, Isaac Gálvez
 Road Race Championships, Francisco Mancebo
 Time Trial Championships, José Iván Gutiérrez
 Tour de France Young rider classification, Vladimir Karpets
Stage 5 Vuelta a España, Denis Menchov

2005 – Illes Balears–Banesto / Illes Balears–Caisse d'Epargne

Trofeo Manacor, Alejandro Valverde
Trofeo Soller, Alejandro Valverde
Trofeo Calvià, Antonio Colom
Clásica de Almería, José Iván Gutiérrez
Stage 3 Paris–Nice, Vicente Reynés
Stage 7 Paris–Nice, Alejandro Valverde
Stage 1 Critérium International – Isaac Gálvez
Stages 3 & 4 Tour of the Basque Country, Alejandro Valverde
Stage 8 Tour de Suisse, Pablo Lastras
 Time Trial Championships, José Iván Gutiérrez
Stage 10 Tour de France, Alejandro Valverde
Clásica a los Puertos, Xabier Zandio
Stage 10 Vuelta a España, Francisco Mancebo

2006 – Caisse d'Epargne–Illes Balears

Trofeo Mallorca, Isaac Gálvez
Trofeo Alcudia, Isaac Gálvez
Stage 2 Tour Méditerranéen, José Iván Gutiérrez
 Overall Volta a la Comunitat Valenciana, Antonio Colom
Stage 4, Antonio Colom
Clásica de Almería, Francisco Pérez
Stage 2 Vuelta a Murcia, Alejandro Valverde
Stage 3 Vuelta a Murcia, José Iván Gutiérrez
Stage 5 Paris–Nice, Joaquim Rodríguez
Stage 3 Vuelta a Castilla y León, José Vicente García
Stage 4 Vuelta a Castilla y León, Marco Fertonani
Stage 1 Tour of the Basque Country, Alejandro Valverde
Flèche Wallonne, Alejandro Valverde
Liège–Bastogne–Liège, Alejandro Valverde
Stage 1 Vuelta a La Rioja, Alexei Markov
Stage 4 Tour de Romandie, Alejandro Valverde
Stage 5 Four Days of Dunkirk, Isaac Gálvez
Stage 12 Giro d'Italia, Joan Horrach
Stage 5 Volta a Catalunya, David Arroyo
 Road Race Championships, Florent Brard
 Overall Tour de France, Óscar Pereiro
Stages 3 & 5 Vuelta a Burgos, José Iván Gutiérrez
Stage 7 Vuelta a España, Alejandro Valverde
 UCI ProTour GC, Alejandro Valverde

2007 – Caisse d'Epargne

Paris–Nice Team classification 
Stage 6 – Luis León Sánchez
Tour de Suisse Team classification 
Trofeo Cala Millor-Cala Bona, Vicente Reynés
Stage 1 Tour Méditerranéen, T.T.T. (Florent Brard, Vladimir Efimkin, Imanol Erviti, Marco Fertonani, José Vicente García, Iván Gutiérrez, Alexei Markov, Aitor Pérez)
Vuelta a Mallorca, Luis León Sánchez
 Overall Volta a Catalunya, Vladimir Karpets
Stage 1, Team Time Trial
 Overall Tour de Suisse GC, Vladimir Karpets
 Overall Eneco Tour, Iván Gutiérrez
Vuelta a España Team classification

2008 – Caisse d'Epargne

Trofeo Pollença, José Joaquín Rojas
 Overall Vuelta a Andalucía, Pablo Lastras
Stage 1 Vuelta a la Comunitat Valenciana, Iván Gutiérrez
 Overall Vuelta a Murcia, Alejandro Valverde
Stage 4, Alejandro Valverde
Stage 3 Tirreno–Adriatico, Joaquim Rodríguez
Stage 7 Paris–Nice, Luis León Sánchez
Paris–Camembert, Alejandro Valverde
Liège–Bastogne–Liège, Alejandro Valverde
Stage 1 Euskal Bizikleta, Daniel Moreno
 Overall Critérium du Dauphiné Libéré, Alejandro Valverde
Stages 1 & 3, Alejandro Valverde
 Road Race Championships, Alejandro Valverde
 Time Trial Championships, Luis León Sánchez
Stages 1 & 6 Tour de France, Alejandro Valverde
Stage 7 Tour de France, Luis León Sánchez
Prueba Villafranca de Ordizia, Vladimir Karpets
Clásica de San Sebastián, Alejandro Valverde
Subida a Urkiola, David Arroyo
 Overall Eneco Tour, Iván Gutiérrez
Prologue, Iván Gutiérrez
Overall Vuelta a Burgos, Xabier Zandio
Stage 2 Vuelta a España, Alejandro Valverde
Stage 18 Vuelta a España, Imanol Erviti
Stage 19 Vuelta a España, David Arroyo
 Overall UCI ProTour, Alejandro Valverde
 Team classification

2009 – Caisse d'Epargne

 Overall Tour Méditerranéen, Luis León Sánchez
Stage 2, Team Time Trial
Stage 1 Tour du Haut Var, Luis León Sánchez
 Overall Paris–Nice, Luis León Sánchez
Stage 7, Luis León Sánchez
Stage 4 Tirreno–Adriatico, Joaquim Rodríguez
Stages 3 & 5 Vuelta a Castilla y León, Alejandro Valverde
Stage 1 Tour of the Basque Country, Luis León Sánchez
Klasika Primavera, Alejandro Valverde
 Overall Four Days of Dunkirk, Rui Costa
 Overall Volta a Catalunya, Alejandro Valverde
Stage 3, Alejandro Valverde
 Overall Critérium du Dauphiné Libéré, Alejandro Valverde
Stage 8 Tour de France, Luis León Sánchez
 Overall Vuelta a Burgos, Alejandro Valverde
Stage 2, Joaquim Rodríguez
Stage 2 Tour de l'Ain, José Joaquín Rojas
 Overall Tour du Limousin, Mathieu Perget
Stage 3, David Arroyo
 Overall Vuelta a España, Alejandro Valverde
Stage 3 Vuelta Chihuahua Internacional, Rui Costa
Stage 4 Vuelta Chihuahua Internacional, Daniel Moreno

2010 – Caisse d'Epargne

Stage 5 Tour Down Under, Luis León Sánchez
Trofeo Deia, Rui Costa
Stage 5 Volta ao Algarve, Luis León Sánchez
 Overall Circuit de la Sarthe, Luis León Sánchez
Stage 1, Luis León Sánchez
Stage 8 Tour de Suisse, Rui Costa
 Road Race Championships, José Iván Gutiérrez
 Time Trial Championships, Luis León Sánchez
 Time Trial Championships, Rui Costa
Clásica de San Sebastián, Luis León Sánchez
Stage 9 Vuelta a España, David López García
Stage 10 Vuelta a España, Imanol Erviti

2011 – Movistar Team

Stage 5 Tour Down Under, Francisco José Ventoso
Stage 6 Volta a Catalunya, José Joaquín Rojas
Stage 2 Tour of the Basque Country, Vasil Kiryienka
Stage 6 Giro d'Italia, Francisco Ventoso
Stage 20 Giro d'Italia, Vasil Kiryienka
Stage 2 Tour de Suisse, Mauricio Soler
  Road Race Championships, José Joaquín Rojas
Stage 8 Tour de France, Rui Costa
Grand Prix Cycliste de Montréal, Rui Costa

2012 – Movistar Team

 Road Race Championships, Francisco Ventoso
 Time Trial Championships, Branislau Samoilau
Stage 5 Tour Down Under, Alejandro Valverde
 Overall Vuelta a Andalucía, Alejandro Valverde
Stage 2, Alejandro Valverde
 Overall Vuelta a Murcia, Nairo Quintana
Stage 1, Nairo Quintana
Stage 3 Paris–Nice, Alejandro Valverde
Stage 1 Tour of the Basque Country, José Joaquín Rojas
Stage 4 Circuit de la Sarthe, Francisco Ventoso
Klasika Primavera, Giovanni Visconti
 Overall Vuelta a Castilla y León, Javier Moreno
 Overall Vuelta a Asturias, Beñat Intxausti
Stage 2a, Jesús Herrada
Stage 1 (ITT) Vuelta a la Comunidad de Madrid, Jonathan Castroviejo
Stage 9 Giro d'Italia, Francisco Ventoso
Stage 14 Giro d'Italia, Andrey Amador
Stage 6 Critérium du Dauphiné, Nairo Quintana
 Overall Tour de Suisse, Rui Costa
Stage 2, Rui Costa
  Overall Route du Sud, Nairo Quintana
Stage 3, Nairo Quintana
Stage 17 Tour de France, Alejandro Valverde
Circuito de Getxo, Giovanni Visconti
Stage 1 Vuelta a España, Team Time Trial
Stages 3 & 8 Vuelta a España, Alejandro Valverde
Stage 5 Tour du Poitou-Charentes, Francisco Ventoso
Giro dell'Emilia, Nairo Quintana

2013 – Movistar Team

Trofeo Serra de Tramuntana, Alejandro Valverde
 Overall Vuelta a Andalucía, Alejandro Valverde
Prologue & Stage 3, Alejandro Valverde
Stage 3 Volta a Catalunya, Nairo Quintana
 Overall Tour of the Basque Country, Nairo Quintana
Stage 4, Nairo Quintana
Klasika Primavera, Rui Costa
 Overall Vuelta a Castilla y León, Rubén Plaza
Stage 3, Rubén Plaza
Vuelta a la Comunidad de Madrid, Javier Moreno
Stage 8 (ITT) Giro d'Italia, Alex Dowsett
Stage 2 Vuelta a Asturias, Javier Moreno
Stages 15 & 17 Giro d'Italia, Giovanni Visconti
Stage 16 Giro d'Italia, Beñat Intxausti
 Overall Tour de Suisse, Rui Costa
Stages 7 & 9 (ITT), Rui Costa
 Time Trial Championships, Alex Dowsett
 Time Trial Championships, Jonathan Castroviejo
 Time Trial Championships, Rui Costa
 Road Race Championships, Jesús Herrada
 King of the Mountains classification Tour de France, Nairo Quintana
 Young Rider classification, Nairo Quintana
Stages 16 & 19, Rui Costa
Stage 20, Nairo Quintana
 Overall Vuelta a Burgos, Nairo Quintana
Stage 5, Nairo Quintana
Stage 5 Tour du Poitou-Charentes, Jesús Herrada
 Points classification in the Vuelta a España, Alejandro Valverde
 Road Race World Championships, Rui Costa
 Overall Tour of Beijing, Beñat Intxausti
Stage 4, Beñat Intxausti

2014 – Movistar Team

 Overall Tour de San Luis, Nairo Quintana
Stage 4, Nairo Quintana
Stage 5 (ITT), Adriano Malori
 Overall Vuelta a Andalucía, Alejandro Valverde
Prologue, Stages 1 & 2, Alejandro Valverde
Vuelta a Murcia, Alejandro Valverde
Roma Maxima, Alejandro Valverde
Stage 7 (ITT) Tirreno–Adriatico, Adriano Malori
GP Miguel Induráin, Alejandro Valverde
Stage 3 (ITT) Circuit de la Sarthe, Alex Dowsett
La Flèche Wallonne, Alejandro Valverde
Stage 1 Vuelta a Castilla y León, José Joaquín Rojas
 Overall Giro d'Italia, Nairo Quintana
 Young rider classification, Nairo Quintana
Stages 16 & 19 (ITT), Nairo Quintana
Stage 1 Route du Sud, Jesús Herrada
Stage 3 Route du Sud, Adriano Malori
 Time Trial Championships, Alejandro Valverde
 Road Race Championships, Ion Izagirre
 Time Trial Championships, Adriano Malori
Stage 3 Tour of Austria, Dayer Quintana
 Team classification
Prueba Villafranca-Ordiziako Klasika, Gorka Izagirre
Stage 3 Tour de Wallonie, Juan José Lobato
Clásica de San Sebastián, Alejandro Valverde
 Overall Vuelta a Burgos, Nairo Quintana
Stage 1, Juan José Lobato
Stage 3, Nairo Quintana
Stage 1 Vuelta a España, Team Time Trial
Stage 6 Vuelta a España, Alejandro Valverde
Stage 21 (ITT) Vuelta a España, Adriano Malori
Stage 5 Tour du Poitou-Charentes, Jesús Herrada

2015 – Movistar Team

Stage 2 Tour Down Under, Juan José Lobato
Stage 5 (ITT) Tour de San Luis, Adriano Malori
Trofeo Serra de Tramuntana, Alejandro Valverde
Stage 1 Tour of Qatar, José Joaquín Rojas
Stage 1b (ITT) Vuelta a Andalucía, Javier Moreno
Stages 2 & 5 Vuelta a Andalucía, Juan José Lobato
 Overall Tirreno–Adriatico, Nairo Quintana
Stage 1 (ITT), Adriano Malori
Stage 5, Nairo Quintana
Stages 2, 5 & 7 Volta a Catalunya, Alejandro Valverde
Stage 2b (ITT) Circuit de la Sarthe, Adriano Malori
Klasika Primavera, José Herrada
La Flèche Wallonne, Alejandro Valverde
Liège–Bastogne–Liège, Alejandro Valverde
 Overall Vuelta a Asturias, Igor Antón
Stage 1, Igor Antón
Stage 2, Jesús Herrada
Stage 8 Giro d'Italia, Beñat Intxausti
 Overall Bayern Rundfahrt, Alex Dowsett
Stage 4 (ITT), Alex Dowsett
 Mountains classification Giro d'Italia, Giovanni Visconti
 Time Trial Championships, Adriano Malori
 Time Trial Championships, Alex Dowsett
 Time Trial Championships, Jonathan Castroviejo
 Road Race Championships, Alejandro Valverde
 Team classification Tour de France
 Young rider classification, Nairo Quintana
 Overall Tour de Pologne, Ion Izagirre
Stage 3, Tour du Limousin, Jesús Herrada
Stage 4 (ITT) Tour du Poitou-Charentes, Adriano Malori
  Team classification Vuelta a España
 Points classification, Alejandro Valverde
Stage 4, Alejandro Valverde

2016 – Movistar Team

 Overall Tour de San Luis, Dayer Quintana
Stage 3 Dubai Tour, Juan José Lobato
 Overall Vuelta a Andalucía, Alejandro Valverde
Stage 5, Alejandro Valverde
 Overall Volta a Catalunya, Nairo Quintana
GP Miguel Induráin, Jon Izagirre
Stage 4 Circuit de la Sarthe, Juan José Lobato
 Overall Vuelta a Castilla y León, Alejandro Valverde
Stage 1, Carlos Betancur
Stage 2, Alejandro Valverde
La Flèche Wallonne, Alejandro Valverde
 Overall Tour de Romandie, Nairo Quintana
Prologue, Ion Izagirre
Stage 2, Nairo Quintana
Stage 2 Vuelta Asturias, Carlos Betancur
Stage 3 Vuelta Asturias, Daniel Moreno
 Overall Vuelta Ciclista Comunidad de Madrid, Juan José Lobato
Stage 1, Juan José Lobato
Stage 16 Giro d'Italia, Alejandro Valverde
Stage 2 Critérium du Dauphiné, Jesús Herrada
 Overall Route du Sud, Nairo Quintana
Stage 3 (ITT), Nairo Quintana
Stage 8 (ITT) Tour de Suisse, Ion Izagirre
 Time Trial Championships, Alex Dowsett
 Time Trial Championships, Ion Izagirre
 Time Trial Championships, Nelson Oliveira
  Road Race Championships, José Joaquín Rojas
Stage 7 (ITT) Tour de Pologne, Alex Dowsett
 Team classification Tour de France
Stage 20, Ion Izagirre
 Time Trial Championships, Jonathan Castroviejo
 Overall Vuelta a España, Nairo Quintana
 Combination classification, Nairo Quintana
Stage 10 Vuelta a España, Nairo Quintana

2017 – Movistar Team

 Overall Volta a la Comunitat Valenciana, Nairo Quintana
Stage 4, Nairo Quintana
Vuelta a Murcia, Alejandro Valverde
 Overall Vuelta a Andalucía, Alejandro Valverde
Stage 1, Alejandro Valverde
Stage 3 (ITT) Volta ao Algarve, Jonathan Castroviejo
 Overall Volta ao Alentejo, Carlos Barbero
 Overall Tirreno–Adriatico, Nairo Quintana
Stage 4, Nairo Quintana
 Overall Volta a Catalunya, Alejandro Valverde
Stages 3, 5 & 7, Alejandro Valverde
Vuelta a La Rioja, Rory Sutherland
Stage 2b (ITT) Circuit de la Sarthe, Alex Dowsett
 Overall Tour of the Basque Country, Alejandro Valverde
Stage 5, Alejandro Valverde
Klasika Primavera, Gorka Izagirre
La Flèche Wallonne, Alejandro Valverde
Liège–Bastogne–Liège, Alejandro Valverde
 Overall Vuelta a Asturias, Nairo Quintana
Stage 2, Nairo Quintana
Stage 2 Vuelta a la Comunidad de Madrid, Carlos Barbero
Stage 3 Vuelta a la Comunidad de Madrid, Jasha Sütterlin
Team classification Giro d'Italia
Stage 8, Gorka Izagirre
Stage 9, Nairo Quintana
Stage 3 Vuelta a Castilla y León, Carlos Barbero
Stage 1 Hammer Sportzone Limburg
 Time Trial Championships, Jonathan Castroviejo
 Road Race Championships, Jesús Herrada
Circuito de Getxo, Carlos Barbero
Stage 4 Vuelta a Burgos, Carlos Barbero

2018 – Movistar Team

 Overall Volta a la Comunitat Valenciana, Alejandro Valverde
Stages 2 & 4, Alejandro Valverde
 Overall Abu Dhabi Tour, Alejandro Valverde
Stage 5, Alejandro Valverde
Stage 4 Tirreno–Adriatico, Mikel Landa
 Overall Paris–Nice, Marc Soler
 Overall Volta a Catalunya, Alejandro Valverde
Stages 2 & 4, Alejandro Valverde
Gran Premio Miguel Induráin, Alejandro Valverde
Klasika Primavera, Andrey Amador
Stage 1 Vuelta a Castilla y León, Carlos Barbero
 Overall Vuelta Asturias Julio Alvarez Mendo, Richard Carapaz
Stage 2, Richard Carapaz
Stage 3 Vuelta Ciclista Comunidad de Madrid, Carlos Barbero
Stage 8 Giro d'Italia, Richard Carapaz
 Overall Vuelta a Aragón, Jaime Roson
Stage 7 Tour de Suisse, Nairo Quintana
 Overall Route d'Occitanie, Alejandro Valverde
Stage 3, Alejandro Valverde
Stage 17 Tour de France, Nairo Quintana
Stage 4 Vuelta a Burgos, Carlos Barbero
Stages 2 & 8 Vuelta a España, Alejandro Valverde
Road Race World Championships, Alejandro Valverde

2019 – Movistar Team

 Overall Vuelta a San Juan, Winner Anacona
Stage 5, Winner Anacona
Stage 2 Tour La Provence, Eduard Prades
Stage 6 Tour Colombia, Nairo Quintana
Stage 3 UAE Tour, Alejandro Valverde
Stage 2 Settimana Internazionale di Coppi e Bartali, Mikel Landa
Klasika Primavera, Carlos Betancur
 Overall Vuelta Asturias, Richard Carapaz
Stage 2, Richard Carapaz
 Overall Giro d'Italia, Richard Carapaz
Stages 4 & 14, Richard Carapaz
 Overall Vuelta a Aragón, Eduard Prades
 Overall Route d'Occitanie, Alejandro Valverde
Stage 1, Alejandro Valverde
 Road Race Championships, Alejandro Valverde
Stage 1 Tour of Austria, Carlos Barbero
Stage 18 Tour de France, Nairo Quintana
Prueba Villafranca-Ordiziako Klasika, Rafael Valls
Stage 2 Vuelta a España, Nairo Quintana
Stage 7 Vuelta a España, Alejandro Valverde

2020 – Movistar Team

Pollença – Andratx, Marc Soler
Stage 2 Vuelta a España, Marc Soler
 Young rider classification Vuelta a España, Enric Mas
 UEC European Track Championships – Madison, Sebastián Mora & Albert Torres
 UEC European Track Championships – Points race, Sebastián Mora

2021 – Movistar Team

GP Miguel Induráin, Alejandro Valverde
Stage 3 Volta a la Comunitat Valenciana, Enric Mas
Stage 3 Tour de Romandie, Marc Soler
Stage 2 Vuelta Asturias, Héctor Carretero
 Overall Vuelta a Andalucía, Miguel Ángel López
Stage 1, Gonzalo Serrano
Stage 3, Miguel Ángel López
Stage 6 Critérium du Dauphiné, Alejandro Valverde
Mont Ventoux Dénivelé Challenge, Miguel Ángel López
 Overall Route d'Occitanie, Antonio Pedrero
Stage 3, Antonio Pedrero
 Time Trial Championships, Abner González
 Road Race Championships, Abner González
Stage 18 Vuelta a España, Miguel Ángel López
Stage 3 Giro di Sicilia, Alejandro Valverde

2022 – Movistar Team

Trofeo Pollença – Port d'Andratx, Alejandro Valverde
 Overall O Gran Camiño, Alejandro Valverde
Stage 3, Alejandro Valverde
 Overall Vuelta a Asturias, Iván Sosa
Stage 2, Iván Sosa
Stage 7 Critérium du Dauphiné, Carlos Verona
 U23 Time Trial Championships, Vinícius Rangel
 Time Trial Championships, Mathias Norsgaard
 Road Race Championships, Abner González
 Road Race Championships, Vinícius Rangel
Stage 2 Tour de Wallonie, Oier Lazkano
Stage 3 Tour de l'Ain, Antonio Pedrero
 Overall Tour du Limousin, Alex Aranburu
Stage 3, Alex Aranburu
 Overall Tour of Britain, Gonzalo Serrano
Stage 4, Gonzalo Serrano
Giro dell'Emilia, Enric Mas
Gran Piemonte, Iván García Cortina
 Overall Tour de Langkawi, Iván Sosa
Stage 3, Iván Sosa

2023 – Movistar Team

Stage 4 Vuelta a San Juan, Fernando Gaviria
 Overall Saudi Tour, Ruben Guerreiro
Stage 4, Ruben Guerreiro
 Overall Tour of Oman, Matteo Jorgenson
Stage 3, Matteo Jorgenson
Stage 3 UAE Tour, Einer Rubio

Supplementary statistics

1981 to 2001

2002 to 2021

2022 to present

Notes

References

Movistar Team (men's team)
Reynolds